The 2023 UEFA European Under-19 Championship qualifying competition is a men's under-19 football competition that will determine the seven teams joining the automatically qualified hosts Malta in the 2023 UEFA European Under-19 Championship final tournament. Players born on or after 1 January 2004 will be eligible to participate.

Russia were originally to participate in the competition before being excluded due to the ongoing invasion of Ukraine, while Liechtenstein opted not to participate meaning that apart from Malta 52 of the remaining 54 UEFA member national teams were entered. Qualification would consist of a Qualifying round in autumn 2022 and an Elite round in spring 2023.

Format 
The qualifying competition will consist of the following two rounds:

 Qualifying Round: Apart from Portugal, which receives a bye to the elite round as the team with the highest seeding coefficient, the remaining 51 teams are drawn in 12 groups of four teams and 1 group of three teams.  Each group is played in single round-robin format at one of the teams selected as hosts after the draw.  The 13 group winners, 13 runners-up, and the third placed team with the best record against the first and second-placed teams in their group advance to the elite round.
 Elite Round: The 28 teams are drawn into seven groups of four teams. Each group is played in single round-robin format at one of the teams selected as hosts after the draw. The seven group winners qualify for the final tournament.

The schedule of each group is as follows, with two rest days between each matchday (Regulations Article 20.04):

Group Schedule

Tiebreakers 
In the qualifying and elite round, teams are ranked according to points (3 points for a win, 1 point for a draw, 0 points for a loss), and if tied on points, the following tiebreaking criteria are applied, in the order given, to determine the rankings (Regulations Articles 14.01 and 14.02):

 Points in head to head matches among tied teams
 Goal difference in head to head matches among tied teams
 Goals scored in head to head matches among tied teams
 If more than two teams are tied, and after applying all head-to-head criteria above, a subset of teams are still tied, all head-to-head criteria above are reapplied exclusively to this subset of teams
 Goal difference in all group matches
 Goals scored in all group matches
 Penalty shoot-out if only two teams have the same number of points, and they met in the last round of the group and are tied after applying all criteria above (not used if more than two teams have the same number of points, or if their rankings are not relevant for qualification for the next stage)
 Disciplinary points (red card = 3 points, yellow card = 1 point, expulsion for 2 yellow cards in one match = 3 points)
 UEFA coefficient ranking for the qualifying round draw

To determine the best third-placed team from the qualifying round, the results against the teams in fourth place are discarded. The following criteria are applied (Regulations Articles 15.01 and 15.02):

 Points
 Goal difference
 Goals scored
 Disciplinary points (total 3 matches)
 UEFA coefficient ranking for the qualifying round draw

Qualifying round

Draw 
The draw for the qualifying round was held on 8 December 2021, at the UEFA headquarters in Nyon, Switzerland.

The teams were seeded according to their coefficient ranking, calculated based on the following:

 2016 UEFA European Under-19 Championship final tournament and qualifying competition (qualifying round and elite round)
 2017 UEFA European Under-19 Championship final tournament and qualifying competition (qualifying round and elite round)
 2018 UEFA European Under-19 Championship final tournament and qualifying competition (qualifying round and elite round)
 2019 UEFA European Under-19 Championship final tournament and qualifying competition (qualifying round and elite round)

Each group contained one team from Pot A, one team from Pot B, one team from Pot C, and one team from Pot D. Based on the decisions taken by the UEFA Emergency Panel, the following pairs of teams could not be drawn in the same group: Spain and Gibraltar, Ukraine and Russia, Serbia and Kosovo, Russia and Kosovo, Bosnia and Herzegovina and Kosovo, Azerbaijan and Armenia.

 Notes

 Teams marked in bold have qualified for the final tournament.

Groups

Group 1

Group 2

Group 3

Group 4

Group 5

Group 6

Group 7

Group 8

Group 9

Group 10

Group 11

Group 12

Group 13

Ranking of third-placed teams
To determine the best third-placed team from the qualifying round which advance to the elite round, only the results of the third-placed teams against the first and second-placed teams in their group are taken into account.

Elite round

Draw
The draw for the elite round was held on 8 December 2022, at the UEFA headquarters in Nyon, Switzerland.

Groups

Group 1

Group 2

Group 3

Group 4

Group 5

Group 6

Group 7

Goalscorers
In the qualifying round 

In the elite round 

In total,

References

External links

Under-19 Matches: 2023 Qualifying, UEFA.com

Qualification
2021
2022 in youth association football
2023 in youth association football
Current association football seasons
Sports events affected by the 2022 Russian invasion of Ukraine